María Elvira Rodríguez Herrer (Madrid, 15 May 1949) is a Spanish economist and politician. She was the president of the Comisión Nacional del Mercado de Valores, a financial regulator, between 2012 and 2016. 
Previously, as a member of the Partido Popular, she served in the Congress of Deputies and as minister of Environment in the second Aznar cabinet, as well as president of the Assembly of Madrid in the 8th term of the regional parliament. Rodríguez has held several other positions including:

 Director General of Budgets (1996-2000)
 Secretary of State for Budgets and Expenditure (2000-2003)
 Minister of the Environment (2003-2004)
 Deputy for Murcia in the Congress of Deputies (2004-2006)
 Minister of Transport of the Community of Madrid (2006-2007)
 President of the Assembly of Madrid (2007-2011)
 Senator designated by the Assembly of Madrid (2011)
 Member of the Congress of Deputies (2011-2012)
 President of the CNMV (since 2012)

References

Bibliography

1949 births
Living people
Members of the 8th Congress of Deputies (Spain)
Members of the 10th Congress of Deputies (Spain)
People from Madrid
Environment ministers of Spain
People's Party (Spain) politicians
Spanish economists
Spanish women economists
21st-century Spanish women politicians
Women government ministers of Spain
Presidents of the Assembly of Madrid
Government ministers of the Community of Madrid
Members of the 9th Assembly of Madrid
Members of the 8th Assembly of Madrid
Members of the People's Parliamentary Group (Assembly of Madrid)
Members of the 14th Congress of Deputies (Spain)